Alan Riding (born 8 December 1943, Rio de Janeiro, Brazil) is a British author and journalist. He was a long-time foreign correspondent for The New York Times, most recently as the paper's European Cultural Correspondent based in Paris. His latest book is And The Show Went On: Cultural Life in Nazi-Occupied Paris.

Early life
After spending his first 11 years in Brazil, Riding went to England to attend Rossall School, Lancashire, and later Bristol University. He studied law before deciding instead to become a journalist.

Career
Riding started with Reuters in New York City, covering the United Nations. In 1971, he left Reuters and moved to Mexico to work as a freelance reporter, principally for The Financial Times, The Economist, and The New York Times. In 1978, he joined The New York Times as Mexico City bureau chief. Before leaving Mexico for Brazil in 1984, he wrote Distant Neighbors: A Portrait of the Mexicans, on modern Mexico.
As the Rio de Janeiro bureau chief, Riding covered the transitions from military regimes to democracies in Brazil and many neighboring countries as well as guerrilla wars and drug trafficking in Peru and Colombia.

In 1989, after a brief stint in Rome, he was named The New York Timess Paris bureau chief, which included coverage of the European Union and NATO. In 1995, he became the paper's European Cultural Correspondent, a post that involved covering all the arts in the region. During this period, he also co-authored (with Leslie Dunton-Downer) "Essential Shakespeare Handbook" and "Opera". In 2007, Riding left journalism to write And The Show Went On, published by Knopf in 2010. It has also been published in Britain and has been translated into Spanish, Catalan, French, Polish, Chinese and Portuguese. He has since devoted himself to writing for the theater.

Riding lives in Paris, with his wife Marlise Simons who is a reporter for The New York Times.

Awards
 1981 Maria Moors Cabot Prize for Latin American Coverage.
 1992 Latin American Studies Association, Special Citation.
 2003 Order of the Águila Azteca, Mexico.
 2011 Palau I Fabre International non-Fiction Prize, Spain.
 2022 Honorary Doctor of Letters, Bristol University, UK (https://www.bristol.ac.uk/graduation/honorary-degrees/)

Books
 Distant Neighbors: A Portrait of the Mexicans. Knopf, New York, 1985; Vintage 1986. 
 Essential Shakespeare Handbook. DK, New York and London, 2004.
 Eyewitness Companions: Opera. DK, New York and London, 2006.
 And The Show Went On; Cultural Life in Nazi-Occupied Paris. Knopf, 2010; Vintage 2011.
 Libertadores, Samsa Editions, Brussels, 2016.()

References

External links
Official website
List of "New York Times" articles by Alan Riding
Author page on Alfred A. Knopf website

1943 births
Living people
People from Rio de Janeiro (city)
British writers
British male journalists
People educated at Rossall School
Alumni of the University of Bristol
Reuters
Financial Times people
The Economist people
The New York Times people
Maria Moors Cabot Prize winners